Guiri is a colloquial Spanish word often used in Spain to refer to uncouth foreign tourists, particularly from Great Britain. However, it can be applied to people from other Northern European countries. In some Latin American countries, a synonym for guiri is gringo.  Although somewhat pejorative, it is not considered a slur by Spanish speakers if used as a lighthearted tease.

Sources 
According to the Real Academia Dictionary, this word can be traced back to 19th century Carlist Wars in the form "guiristino", the pronunciation of Basque-speaking Carlist forces of the name of their enemies, the Cristinos (after regent Queen María Cristina). It entered the Diccionario de la lengua española de la Real Academia Española in 1925. When a "guiri" would be the term used by the opposing political parties of the time, later to be exclusively used for the Guardia Civil and Policía Armada (Armed Police) under the Francoist régime. 

There is another theory by Juan Goytisolo that guiri is a neologism from Caló language which derives from Moroccan and Algerian Arabic gaouri (a word with a similar meaning applying to Europeans), which in turn stems from Ottoman Turkish gâvur.

References

Ethnonyms
Carlism
Catalan language
Spanish language
Tourism in Spain